Akmal Hakim Akbar (born August 11, 1980) is a former American football linebacker of the National Football League (NFL) and Canadian Football League (CFL). He was originally drafted by the New England Patriots in the fifth round (163rd overall) of the 2001 NFL Draft. He played college football at Washington.

Akbar earned a Super Bowl ring with the Patriots in Super Bowl XXXVI. He has also been a member of the Houston Texans, St. Louis Rams, Tampa Bay Buccaneers, Jacksonville Jaguars and Calgary Stampeders.

Early years
Akbar was born the son of Kenneth and Rasheeda Akbar on August 11, 1980 in Riverside, California. Akbar attended Riverside Polytechnic High School, where he was selected All-California Interscholastic Federation (CIF), all-county and all-league pick while registering 91 tackles, with six interceptions, three fumble recoveries and seven forced fumbles as a senior. He also received eight votes in Long Beach Press Telegram’s ‘Best in the West’ poll and was named to the Tacoma News Tribune’s ‘Western 100’ team. He was rated the eighth-best defensive back in the Western Region by Prep Star.

College career
Akbar was a three-year letterman at the University of Washington. Akbar played in 33 games, including 26 consecutive starts at safety. He proved to be a versatile player, starting at both Strong and Free safety. In his college career, he recorded 225 tackles (123 solos) with eight tackles for losses. He also had four interceptions for a total of 52 yards. He also recorded five fumble recoveries and forced two fumbles. He played a major role in the 2000 Huskies 11-1 season and #3 overall ranking by Associated Press and ESPN/USA Today. While at Washington, he majored in Construction Management.

As a freshman in 1998, Akbar was a First-team All-American selection by The Sporting News, while adding honorable mention from Football News. He played in all 11 games at Free safety, starting the final four games of the season. He ranked third on the team with 59 tackles (36 solo).

As a sophomore in 1999, Akbar was a Second-team All-Pac-10 selection. He was named team Co-Outstanding Defensive Player of the Year by KOMO 1000 AM. He was switched to Strong safety before the start of season and started all 11 games. He finished fourth on the team with 69 tackles (33 solo), including three tackles-for-loss. He recorded one interception and deflected six others. He forced and recovered two fumbles. He also had one quarterback pressure.

As a junior in 2000, Akbar was a First-team All-American selection by the NFL Draft Report and CNNSI, as well as an honorable mention selection from College Football News. He was also a First-team All-Pac-10 selection. He led the team with 97 tackles (54 solo), including five for losses. He intercepted two passes for 31 yards and deflected six others. He also recovered two fumbles.

Akbar lined up at Strong safety for the first eight games before shifting to free safety when teammate and friend Curtis Williams suffered a career-ending spinal cord injury. After Williams' injury, Akbar considered quitting football. He recorded double-digit tackles in four games during the season and also set a career-high with 19 tackles against Oregon State. It was the highest single-game total since John Fiala recorded 22 tackles in 1996.

Career statistics

Professional career
Akbar chose to forgo his senior season and enter the 2001 NFL Draft. Before the draft, Akbar was scouted and he ran a 4.5-second 40-yard dash. He was a second-day selection, taken in the fifth round (163rd overall) by the New England Patriots.

New England Patriots
After being drafted by the Patriots, Akbar signed two-year contract worth close $600,000 and included a signing bonus worth close to $75,000. He was released by the team in March 2002.

Akbar played on Special teams in six games for the Super Bowl champion Patriots. Akbar recorded five tackles for the season. He made his NFL debut in Miami. He played special teams and recorded two tackles against the San Diego Chargers. He recorded one tackle on special teams in Atlanta.

Car accident
In November 2001, Akbar suffered a spinal injury and nearly died. He was driving home, after socializing with teammates. He said he fell asleep at the wheel and woke up to find he was speeding down the interstate, going at least 80 mph. His Cadillac Escalade went off the road, and Akbar who wasn't wearing a seat belt, resulting in him being thrown through the sunroof. As a result of the accident, he suffered three fractured vertebrae, broken ribs and an injured hip and shoulder. Due to his injuries he spent a month in the hospital, eating through an IV. Police said alcohol wasn't involved, however he was charged with driving with the intent to endanger, among other offenses.

Due to the severity of his injuries, a doctor told Akbar he would not play football again. However, three months after the accident, he was once again working out, preparing to make his way back. Although he did not play in the Super Bowl, the Patriots presented him with a ring.

Houston Texans
On March 26, 2002, Akbar was claimed off waivers by the Houston Texans. However, on September 2, 2002, he was released.

St. Louis Rams
Akbar was signed by the St. Louis Rams on November 5, 2002. He played in four games for the Rams, playing on Special teams. He finished the season with two Special teams tackles. He made his Rams debut and recorded a special teams tackle at Philadelphia.

He was waived by the team on August 31, 2003.

Tampa Bay Buccaneers
On December 11, 2003, Akbar was signed to the practice squad of the Tampa Bay Buccaneers, but only spent five days there before being signed to the active roster of the Jacksonville Jaguars.

Jacksonville Jaguars
Akbar then spent the final two weeks of the season on the inactive list after being signed off the Tampa Bay practice squad on December 16, 2003 by the Jacksonville Jaguars.

In 2004, he was allocated to NFL Europe. He was released by the Jaguars on September 7, 2004. It was the last time he was a member of an NFL team.

Calgary Stampeders
On April 26, 2006, Akbar was signed to the practice squad of the Calgary Stampeders. He wasn't able to play very much during the Stampeders pre-season due to a hamstring injury. Due to being slowed by the hamstring injuries, he did not win the starting linebacker position. The Stampeders released him on October 14, 2006.

Career statistics

*Offseason and/or practice squad member only

References

External links
New England Patriots bio
Washington Huskies bio
Jacksonville Jaguars player Card at ESPN.com
Profile at Yahoo! Sports
Jacksonville Jaguars profile at SI.com
Draft profile at CNNSI.com
Player page at Football Database
Calgary Stampeders profile at Scout.com
Houston Texans profile at Scout.com

1980 births
Living people
Sportspeople from Riverside, California
American football safeties
Washington Huskies football players
New England Patriots players
Houston Texans players
St. Louis Rams players
Tampa Bay Buccaneers players
Jacksonville Jaguars players
Calgary Stampeders players
Players of American football from Riverside, California
Players of Canadian football from California